Miłowice may refer to the following places in Poland:
Miłowice, Lower Silesian Voivodeship (south-west Poland)
Miłowice, Lubusz Voivodeship (west Poland)
Miłowice, Opole Voivodeship (south-west Poland)